is an airport located in the city of Toyama, Toyama Prefecture, Japan. The airport services are primarily domestic flights and international flights to China and Taiwan: however, seasonal international charter flights also service Toyama from April to June.

Located approximately 7 kilometers south of central Toyama, the airport is part of the Tateyama Kurobe Alpine Route and is the closest international airport to UNESCO World Heritage Site of Gokayama. As the airport has convenient access to downtown Toyama and various highways, the airport also serves a wide area of the Jōetsu region of Niigata Prefecture and Hida region of Gifu Prefecture.

The airport opened on August 20, 1963, with regularly scheduled flights by All Nippon Airways to Tokyo Haneda Airport using a Fokker F-27. This was replaced by a NAMC YS-11 in 1970. In 1984, the runway was lengthened from 1200 to 2000 meters to accommodate jet operations and a new terminal building was completed. An international terminal was completed in March 1993, Asiana becoming the first international airline to schedule service to the airport.

It is the only airport built on a riverbed in Japan, and the runways and aprons are located on the riverbed on the right bank of the Jinzū River. The terminal building is outside the river, and the boarding bridge built across the levee is Japan's longest. Because of the location of the riverbed, it was not possible to completely install the instrument landing system, which restricts operations in poor visibility due to heavy snow in winter. In addition, physical restrictions are severe, as there is little space on the site and taxiways can not be made to both ends of the runway (there is no parallel taxiway, and planes must made takes a U-turn on a turning pad at the end of the runway for takeoff. The number of departure and arrival flights is limited to 15 per day according to the local agreement. Although plans to relocate the airport, possibly to an offshore location, were discussed, traffic to the airport has decreased dramatically with the opening of  the Hokuriku Shinkansen in March 2015.

Airlines and destinations

Statistics

References

External links 

 Official website

Airports in Japan
Transport in Toyama Prefecture
Buildings and structures in Toyama Prefecture
Toyama (city)
1963 establishments in Japan
Airports established in 1963